Saharsa Junction railway station is a main railway station in Saharsa district, Bihar. Its code is SHC. It serves Kosi Division area. The station consists of 5 platforms. It is an A category railway station of Samastipur railway division. This railway junction has been certified by ISO:14001:2015 for environmental management. Due to less railway facility, less expansion of rail network in Supaul & Madhepura district's people used to catch trains from Saharsa instead of their own stations. It is the main railway junction of Kosi division.

Strategic importance

It is planned to be the largest and busiest railway station in Samastipur railway division after the completion of Saharsa–Forbesganj and Saharsa–Darbhanga routes as it will be a Source-Terminus station of many premium and other trains as well as a major stoppage of ongoing trains. Recently, Saharsa Junction railway station has been selected under Railway Privatisation scheme making the facilities and infrastructure matching the world class level.

Saharsa Jn rail yard is the first LHB coach maintenance yard in East Central Rail Zone (ECR). Establishing a hi-tech washing pit has been approved by Ministry of Railways at a cost of 12 crores 44 lakhs INR. It is the top 50 rail ticket booking station in India and top 5 rail ticket booking station in ECR zone.

To reduce the congestion of Barauni–Katihar–Guwahati route, two bypass routes are under construction one from Jalalgarh to Kisanganj and other from Araria to Thakurganj. After the completion the train traffic going to North East India will be diverted to Saharsa–Purnea–Jalalgarh–Guwahati and Saharsa–Forbesganj–Araria–Silliguri lines.

Connectivity

Saharsa connected to the major cities in India like Patna, Munger, Delhi, Kolkata Mumbai, Surat, Ranchi, Kanpur, Prayag Raj, Lucknow, Amritsar many other cities by the railway network and serves the city with numerous trains. India's first Graib Rath has started from here which was 12203 Saharsa–Amritsar Garib Rath. It is also the originating junction of premium train such as Humsafar Express, Garib Rath Express, Rajya Rani Express, Superfast Express, and many Express train.

Facilities
The major facilities available are waiting rooms, retiring room, computerized reservation facility, reservation counter, vehicle parking etc.

There are refreshment rooms vegetarian and non vegetarian, tea stall, book stall, post and telegraphic office and Government Railway police office.

Major trains 

Bandra Terminus–Saharsa Humsafar Express
Vaishali Express
Saharsa–Amritsar Garib Rath Express
Saharsa–Patna Rajya Rani Express
Poorbiya Express
Janhit Express
Hate Bazare Express
Saharsa–Amritsar Jan Sadharan Express (via Chandigarh)
Saharsa–Amritsar Jan Sewa Express
Saharsa–Barauni Express
Janaki Intercity Express
Saharsa–Anand Vihar Terminal Jan Sadharan Express
Saharsa–Amritsar Jan Sadharan Express (via Sirhind)
Kosi Express
Saharsa–Rajendra Nagar Terminal Intercity Express
Saharsa–Samastipur Passenger
Saharsa–Purnia Passenger

References

Railway stations in Saharsa district
Railway junction stations in Bihar
Samastipur railway division
Transport in Saharsa